Zhiluozhen Campaign was fought in Shaanxi on November 20–23, 1935 between the forces of the Chinese Communist Party and the Northeast Army nominally under the control of the Kuomintang Nationalist Government with actual control by warlord Zhang Xueliang. With minimal casualties, the communist capture over 5,000 prisoners; 3,500 rifles; 176 machine guns; 8 pieces of artillery and 300 horses.

References

External links
 历史见证人讲述直罗镇战役，新华社

Conflicts in 1935
Campaigns of the Chinese Civil War